Nikita Nehemiah Whitlock (born May 16, 1991) is a former American football defensive tackle/running back hybrid player. He was signed by the Cincinnati Bengals as an undrafted free agent in 2014. Whitlock has also been a member of the Dallas Cowboys and New York Giants in the National Football League (NFL), the Hamilton Tiger-Cats in the Canadian Football League (CFL), and the Tampa Bay Vipers in the XFL. He played college football at Wake Forest.

Early years
Whitlock attended and played football at Wylie High School. He was named the AP Texas Class 5A Defensive Player of the Year in 2008. The Dallas Morning News named him the All-Area Defensive Player of the Year. Whitlock's height made it difficult for him to get noticed by college recruiters.

His high school coach, Bill Howard, said, "If he was 6-foot-3, he'd be the No. 1 defensive lineman in the country". Mesquite Horn coach Rodney Webb called Whitlock "the best defensive player he had seen at the high school level". Dallas Morning News sportswriter Matt Wixon called Whitlock "one of the most dominant high school linemen" he has ever seen.

Whitlock had a standout high school career at Wylie High School, earning AP Defensive Player of the Year honors in 2008, after playing defensive tackle and linebacker.

He was offered scholarships to play football for SMU and Northwestern State, and also received interest from TCU and Utah State, before committing to Wake Forest.

College career

Whitlock played college football at Wake Forest from 2009 to 2013. At Wake Forest, Whitlock played nose guard. Whitlock redshirted his freshman year in 2009, practicing as a linebacker.

As a redshirt freshman, he was named second-team freshman All-American by College Football News and Rivals.com. Phil Steele named him fourth team All-ACC in 2012, as well as second-team pre-season All-ACC in 2013. He earned second-team All-ACC defensive honors in 2011 and 2012. In 2013, he was on the Bednarik Award watchlist.

College statistics
from Wakeforrestsports.com

Professional career

Cincinnati Bengals

On May 12, 2014, Whitlock was signed as an undrafted free agent with the Cincinnati Bengals. Upon signing with the Bengals, Whitlock was moved from defensive tackle to fullback. At 5'10", Whitlock was considered too small to play defensive tackle at the NFL level.

He was released by the Bengals on August 30, 2014.

Dallas Cowboys
After being released by the Bengals, the Dallas Cowboys signed Whitlock to their practice squad on September 1, 2014. He was then released on September 9. The Cowboys re-signed Whitlock to the practice squad on September 16. He was then released again on November 3.

A week later, Whitlock worked out for the Baltimore Ravens but was not signed. While a free agent, Whitlock was suspended by the NFL for four games on November 21; for violating the policy on performance-enhancing substances.

New York Giants
On December 17, 2014, Whitlock was signed to the New York Giants practice squad. He worked as both a fullback and a linebacker during practice. On December 29, 2014, Whitlock signed a futures contract with the Giants.

In the 2015 NFL season,  Whitlock defeated incumbent Henry Hynoski for the fullback spot after surviving final cuts. Whitlock won the roster spot by his special teams play, as well as being younger and less expensive than Hynoski. In the final preseason game, Whitlock took snaps at both fullback and defensive tackle. He performed dual duty again during the Giants game against the Washington Redskins on September 24, 2015. On December 23, 2015, Whitlock suffered a knee injury in the week 15 game against the Carolina Panthers, and was placed on season-ending injured reserve. He finished the season playing 132 offensive plays, 61 defensive plays, and 276 special teams plays.

On August 30, 2016, Whitlock was waived/injured by the Giants and placed on injured reserve. On September 15, 2016, he was suspended for 10 games for violation of the NFL's PED policy.

After spending the entire 2016 season on injured reserve, Whitlock was not offered a contract by the Giants, making him a free agent.

Hamilton Tiger-Cats
On August 10, 2017, Whitlock was signed to the practice roster of the Hamilton Tiger-Cats of the Canadian Football League (CFL) as a defensive tackle. He was promoted to the active roster on August 16, 2017. Whitlock played in 11 games in 2017, making 15 tackles, 9 special teams tackles, and 3 sacks. In 2018, Whitlock's playing time increased to 17 games, but his production remained similar with 18 tackles, as well as 3 sacks, 1 forced fumble, and 9 special teams tackles. Part of the plateau in defensive stats was due to a position change; during training camp in 2018, Whitlock was converted to running back in addition to defensive and special teams duties, becoming a rare player who took part in all 3 phases of the game. Despite some fumbling issues in a preseason game Whitlock remained a reserve running back alongside Mercer Timmis and Sean Thomas Erlington while starter Alex Green was out with injury and recent addition John White IV was learning the Ti-Cats playbook on the practice roster. In limited touches early in the season, Whitlock recorded 6 runs for 38 yards, and three catches for 10 yards. Due to his versatility, Whitlock was signed to a two-year contract extension in February 2019. However, Whitlock was one of several players released prior to 2019 training camp, including Green who, like Whitlock, had been recently extended.

Tampa Bay Vipers
In October 2019, Whitlock was among the open-round selections by the Tampa Bay Vipers in the 2020 XFL Draft. In the five games played prior to cancellation due to the COVID-19 pandemic, Whitlock had 19 tackles and a pass knockdown, earning him recognition as one of the top defensive tackles in the XFL by Pro Football Focus. He had his contract terminated when the league suspended operations on April 10, 2020.

Personal life
Whitlock is the son of Raymond and Genny Whitlock. Whitlock was originally going to be named Sergio Nehemiah Whitlock, but his grandmother did not like the name. His father, who worked for Yellow Pages, opened up a phone book to a random page and put his finger down to select his name, ending up with Nikita. Whitlock graduated from Wake Forest with a Health and Exercise Science major.

On December 6, 2016, Whitlock's Moonachie, New Jersey home was subject to vandalism with racially charged graffiti. The perpetrator broke into his home, graffiti-ed several racial slurs and swastikas on his walls, and stole jewelry and electronics.

Whitlock is an ambassador for Up2Us Sports, a national non-profit organization dedicated to supporting underserved youth by providing them with coaches trained in positive youth development.

References

External links
Wake Forest Demon Deacons bio

1991 births
Living people
Sportspeople from Bergen County, New Jersey
People from Moonachie, New Jersey
People from Wylie, Texas
Players of American football from Texas
Sportspeople from the Dallas–Fort Worth metroplex
American football linebackers
American football defensive tackles
American football fullbacks
Canadian football defensive linemen
American players of Canadian football
Wake Forest Demon Deacons football players
Cincinnati Bengals players
Dallas Cowboys players
New York Giants players
Hamilton Tiger-Cats players
Tampa Bay Vipers players
Canadian football running backs